BELLA is an American luxury lifestyle and fashion magazine. Distributed nationally, BELLA covers topics like fashion, beauty, health, philanthropy, arts and culture, cuisine, travel, celebrity and entertainment. 

BELLA was founded in January 2011 by Daniel and Courtenay Hall who ran the company through the August 2019 issue. On August 1, 2019, Vanessa Coppes acquired BELLA, becoming its owner, CEO and editor-in-chief.

References

External links
Official website

2011 establishments in New York (state)
Bimonthly magazines published in the United States
Celebrity magazines published in the United States
Fashion magazines published in the United States
Lifestyle magazines published in the United States
Magazines established in 2011
Magazines published in New York City
Men's fashion magazines
Women's fashion magazines
Women's magazines published in the United States